The 140th Pennsylvania House of Representatives District is located in Southeastern Pennsylvania and has been represented since 2007 by John Galloway.

District profile
The 140th Pennsylvania House of Representatives District is located in Bucks County. It includes the Delaware Division of the Pennsylvania Canal and the Grundy Mill Complex. It is made up of the following areas:

 Bristol 
 Bristol Township (PART)
 Ward 05 [PART, Division 01]
 Ward 07 [PART, Division 01]
 Ward 09 [PART, Divisions 02 and 03]
 Falls Township
 Middletown Township (PART)
 District Lower [PART, Divisions 07, 09 and 11]
 Morrisville (PART, Ward 04)
 Tullytown

Representatives

Recent election results

References

External links
District map from the United States Census Bureau
Pennsylvania House Legislative District Maps from the Pennsylvania Redistricting Commission.  
Population Data for District 140 from the Pennsylvania Redistricting Commission.

Government of Bucks County, Pennsylvania
140